The Vanishing Half is a historical fiction novel by American author Brit Bennett. It is her second novel and was published by Riverhead Books in 2020. The novel debuted at number one on The New York Times fiction best-seller list. HBO acquired the rights to develop a limited series with Bennett as executive producer. The Vanishing Half garnered acclaim from book critics, and Emily Temple of Literary Hub noted that in 2020 the book most frequently listed among the year's best, making 25 lists.

Synopsis
The novel is a multi-generational family saga set between the 1940s to the 1990s and centers on identical twin sisters Desiree and Estelle "Stella" Vignes and their daughters Jude and Kennedy. Desiree and Stella are light-skinned black sisters who were raised in the fictional town of Mallard, Louisiana and witnessed the lynching of their father in the 1940s. In 1954, at the age of 16, the twins run away to New Orleans. However, Stella disappears shortly thereafter only to be living her life in secret as a white woman.  

Stella meets a successful, wealthy man named Blake while working as his secretary at a marketing firm called Maison Blanche. They get married and have a daughter named Kennedy who eventually drops out of college to pursue a career in acting. The family lives in an affluent white neighborhood in Los Angeles, California, and Stella hides the fact that she's black in order to fit into this new life. 

Meanwhile, Desiree leaves an abusive marriage and moves away from Washington, D.C. to return to Mallard with her eight-year-old dark-skinned daughter, Jude. Jude grows older and moves to Los Angeles through a track scholarship at the University of California, Los Angeles. She falls in love with Reese while in college and eventually gets a job to help him save for surgery. While working part time as a caterer in Beverly Hills, Jude sees a woman who appears to be her mother's doppelgänger. The woman is actually Stella. Jude meets Kennedy at a local theater and tells her the secret of her mother's identity. 

The novel has a nonlinear narrative structure.

Themes 
Colorism

Bennett explores the issue of colorism throughout the book. In the novel, an ex-slave named Alphonse Decuir established a town called Mallard for only light-skinned people. This leads to a fixation among the town about lightness coupled by a disgust for dark-skinned people. Jude, who is the daughter of the main character, is bullied for the darker color of her skin in school and is called names such as "Tar Baby" and "Blueskin." The townspeople also view Desiree's relationship with Early, who is a dark skinned man, as unfathomable because to them dark-skinned people were undesirable. Throughout Desiree and Stella's childhood, their mother Adele warns them against dark-skinned men. The book explores the effects of colorism and the lengths people go to in order to be accepted as beautiful or lighter.

Domestic abuse

Domestic abuse is another themes of the book as it manifests in the main character Desiree's struggles with abuse from her darker-skinned husband Sam. In the novel, Sam physically and emotionally abuses Desiree until she eventually runs away with her daughter Jude back to Mallard. On some occasions, Desiree tries to rationalize the abuse from her husband and attributes it to his frustrations with the assassination of Martin Luther King Jr., as well as the riots that erupted around that time and his desire to have another child. It highlights how domestic violence victims often try to rationalize the actions of their abusers and are reluctant to leave them.

Reception
The novel debuted at number one on The New York Times fiction best-seller list for the week ending June 6, 2020. As of the week ending April 24, 2021, the novel has spent 42 weeks on the list.

At the review aggregator website Book Marks, which assigns individual ratings to book reviews from mainstream literary critics, indicated that the novel received a cumulative "Rave" rating based on 38 reviews, with only one "mixed" review. Publishers Weekly wrote, "Bennett renders her characters and their struggles with great compassion, and explores the complicated state of mind that Stella finds herself in while passing as white." In its starred review, Kirkus Reviews wrote, "The scene in which Stella adopts her white persona is a tour de force of doubling and confusion." The Washington Post called The Vanishing Half a "fierce examination of contemporary passing and the price so many pay for a new identity". The New York Times wrote, "Bennett balances the literary demands of dynamic characterisation with the historical and social realities of her subject matter."

It was selected for the New York Times Book Reviews "10 Best Books of 2020" list.

Awards and honors

Television adaptation
Within a month of publication it was reported that HBO had acquired the rights in the "low seven-figures" to develop a limited series with Brit Bennett as executive producer. In February 2021, it was reported that Aziza Barnes and Jeremy O. Harris will both write and produce the adaptation. Issa Rae was also named as an executive producer.  On June 24, 2022, O. Harris left the series as writer and executive producer.

References

External links 

 Official website

2020 American novels
African-American novels
American historical novels
American mystery novels
Family saga novels
Literature by African-American women
Multiracial literature
Nonlinear narrative novels
Novels about race and ethnicity
Novels set in Los Angeles
Novels set in Louisiana
Novels with transgender themes
Riverhead Books books
Twins in fiction
Works about twin sisters
Third-person narrative novels